The Alpha Fire Company provides fire and rescue services for the Borough of State College, College Township, Ferguson Township, Patton Township, and The Pennsylvania State University.

The company was formed in 1899 as the Union Fire Company and changed its name to Alpha Fire Company in 1900.

Mission and community service
The Mission Statement of Alpha Fire is: "To protect the lives and property of the members of the Borough of State College and surrounding communities." Volunteers who serve with the company are each required to undergo various training modules, the first of which amounts to approximately 80 hours over the members' first 12 weeks with the company. All members are required to obtain their national Firefighter I Certification within 24 months of joining.

In addition to the protection of property and lives, members of the fire department also engage in activities which foster positive working relations between the department and members of the community. In the past such activities have included transporting Santa Clause through the borough during State College's annual Christmas Eve celebration.

Apparatus
Alpha Fire Company operates a fleet of 26 vehicles.

Command 5 - Incident command post rotated among the line officers
Car 5 - Fire Chief's car, additional command post
Car 55 - Fire Director's car, additional command post
Traffic 5-1 - 2021 Ford F-350 Fire police traffic unit
Traffic 5-2 - 2021 Ford F-350 Fire police traffic unit
Special Unit 5 - Modified 2005 Chevrolet Silverado Crew Cab
Utility 5-1 - 2005 Chevrolet 2500
Utility 5-2 - 2012 Chevrolet 2500
Utility 5-3 - 2013 Chevrolet Tahoe
Utility 5-4 - 2013 Ford Interceptor
Utility 5-5 - 2012 Ford Explorer
Fire Marshal 55 - 2013 Ford Interceptor
UTV 5 - Kubota RTV
Drop-Deck 5 - 2019 JLG Utility Trailer
Service 55 - 2018 Ford F-350 with a Reading Body
Heavy Lift 5 - 1988 Nissan N6000 Fork Lift
Foam Trailer 5 - 2005 Tandem Axel Class-B Foam Trailer
Decon Trailer 5 - 2014 Mobile Decon Trailer
Hazmat 55 - 1997 Seagrave Walk-In HazMat Unit

Engine Companies
Engine 5-1 - 2005 Pierce Dash
Engine 5-2 - 2002 Pierce Dash Custom Engine
Engine 5-3 - 2002 Pierce Dash Custom Engine
Engine 5-4 - 2017 Pierce Velocity PUC
Tanker 5-1 - 2013 Pierce/Kenworth Custom Tanker
Tanker 5-2 - 2021 Pierce/Kenworth Custom Tanker

Truck Companies
Truck 5-1 - 2016 95 Foot Pierce Velocity ladder Truck
Truck 5-2 - 2009 75 Foot Pierce Aerial Scope tower ladder Truck
Quint 5 - 2010 75 Foot Aerial PUC Quint on a Pierce Arrow XT Chassis.

Rescue Company
Rescue 5 - 2000 Saulsbury Cougar Series Rescue on a Spartan Gladiator Long four-door Chassis

Stations
Alpha Fire operates out of three stations:

Main Station
The Main Station at 400 West Beaver Avenue opened in 1974. The Main Station has a Meeting Room, Maintenance Shop, Lounge, Watch Office, Kitchen, Administration Office, Gym, and Bunk room. The bunk room houses 6 live-ins and has room for 17 total bunks. The station houses 5 pieces of apparatus, Engine 5-2, Engine 5-3, Truck 5-1, Rescue 5, Tanker 5-1. Traffic units 5-1 and 5-2, Utility 5-1, Utility 5-4, Service 55, Special Unit 5, and Command 5 are also housed here.

College Township Station
The College Township station is a sub-station housed in the basement of the College Township Building at 1481 East College Avenue.  This station has a Watchroom, Office, Lounge, Bunkroom, Live-in rooms for 4 live-ins, and a Kitchen.  Engine 5-1, Quint 5, Utility 55, and Fire Marshal 55 are housed here.

Patton Township Station
The Patton Township Sub-Station facility at 2598 Green Tech Drive opened in 2001. It has rooms for four live-in members and a bunkroom for additional firefighters. The station houses Truck 5-2, Engine 5-4, Tanker 5-2, Utility 5-2, and Utility 5-3.

See also
Centre County, Pennsylvania
Borough of State College
College Township
Ferguson Township
Patton Township
The Pennsylvania State University.

References

External links
Alpha Fire Company

Centre County, Pennsylvania
State College, Pennsylvania